Menifee County is a county located in the U.S. state of Kentucky. As of the 2020 census, the population was 6,113, making it the fifth-least populous county in Kentucky. Its county seat is Frenchburg. The county is named for Richard Hickman Menefee, U.S. Congressman, although the spelling has changed. It is a prohibition or dry county. Menifee County is part of the Mount Sterling, KY Micropolitan Statistical Area, which is also included in the Lexington-Fayette-Richmond-Frankfort, KY Combined Statistical Area. It is located in the foothills of the Cumberland Plateau.

History

Menifee County was formed on May 29, 1869, from portions of Bath, Montgomery, Morgan, Powell, and Wolfe counties.

In the 2008 Presidential Election Menifee County was one of eight in the state of Kentucky where the majority of voters voted for Barack Obama.

On March 2, 2012, an EF3 tornado hit Menifee county and several other surrounding counties. Many were injured, and three were killed.

Geography 

Menifee County is mountainous and heavily forested. Much of the land is within Daniel Boone National Forest. Only about 10% of the county's land is in cultivated farms, and the county ranks 102nd of Kentucky's 120 counties in agricultural revenue.

Adjacent counties
 Bath County  (north)
 Rowan County  (northeast)
 Morgan County  (east)
 Wolfe County  (south)
 Powell County  (southwest)
 Montgomery County  (west)

National protected area
 Daniel Boone National Forest (part)

Arts & culture 
Menifee County is home to the Menifee Community Theatre Group, a small-town local and regional arts organization that has produced 17 theatrical productions to date. The group has over 40 members and hosts an annual locally-written theatrical and film presentation, taking place at the Menifee Mountain Memories Festival and centering on local and Appalachian stories collected from local citizens.

Demographics 

As of the census of 2000, there were 6,556 people, 2,537 households, and 1,900 families residing in the county. The racial makeup of the county was 97.64% White, 1.37% Black or African American, 0.12% Native American, 0.03% Asian, 0.02% Pacific Islander, 0.14% from other races, and 0.69% from two or more races. 1.11% of the population were Hispanic or Latino of any race.

There were 2,537 households, out of which 32.00% had children under the age of 18 living with them, 62.40% were married couples living together, 8.80% had a female householder with no husband present, and 25.10% were non-families. 22.10% of all households were made up of individuals, and 9.10% had someone living alone who was 65 years of age or older. The average household size was 2.49 and the average family size was 2.88.

In the county, the population was spread out, with 24.90% under the age of 18, 10.10% from 18 to 24, 28.10% from 25 to 44, 25.20% from 45 to 64, and 11.80% who were 65 years of age or older. The median age was 36 years. For every 100 females, there were 101.80 males. For every 100 females age 18 and over, there were 98.10 males.

The median income for a household in the county was $22,064, and the median income for a family was $26,325. Males had a median income of $25,670 versus $17,014 for females. The per capita income for the county was $11,399. About 23.40% of families and 29.60% of the population were below the poverty line, including 38.50% of those under age 18 and 23.40% of those age 65 or over.

Politics
The county has historically been Democratic-dominated, voting for the Democratic nominee in every election from its first election in 1872 through 1996 apart from one lone show of support for Herbert Hoover in 1928. In the 21st century, however, it has, like most of Kentucky outside the Louisville, Lexington, and Frankfort areas, trended powerfully Republican. It cast its second-ever Republican vote for George W. Bush in 2000, even as Bush narrowly lost the national popular vote, and although it returned to the Democratic fold in 2004 and 2008, it was at greatly reduced levels compared to what Democrats could typically count on in the 20th century; neither John Kerry nor Barack Obama in 2008 managed even to reach the vote share in the county that George McGovern received in 1972. The county went red again in 2012, voting for its first-ever losing Republican nominee, and has continued voting Republican by increasing margins. In 2020, it gave Donald Trump nearly three-quarters of its vote, approaching the 76.8% it gave Carter in 1976 and Lyndon Johnson in 1964. Joe Biden, meanwhile, sank below a quarter of the county's vote, a level even Hillary Clinton had managed to stay above.

Communities

 Denniston
 Frenchburg (county seat)
 Korea
 Mariba
 Means
 Pomeroyton
 Scranton
 Sudith
 Wellington

See also
 National Register of Historic Places listings in Menifee County, Kentucky

References

External links
 Menifee County Website
 Menifee County Schools
 The Kentucky Highlands Project

 
Kentucky counties
Mount Sterling, Kentucky micropolitan area
Counties of Appalachia
1869 establishments in Kentucky
Populated places established in 1869